Daugirdas Šemiotas (born May 20, 1983) is an amateur boxer from Lithuania who is best known for winning the bronze medal in the light heavyweight division at the 2007 World Amateur Boxing Championships.

He defeated Ramadan Yasser 18:9 but injured himself and did not fight his semi against Artur Beterbiyev. At the 2008 Summer Olympics he lost his first bout 3:11 to Yerkebuian Shynaliyev. He failed to qualify for the 2004 Summer Olympics by ending up in third place at the 1st AIBA European 2004 Olympic Qualifying Tournament in Plovdiv, Bulgaria.

External links
World 2007

1983 births
Living people
Light-heavyweight boxers
Boxers at the 2008 Summer Olympics
Olympic boxers of Lithuania
Lithuanian male boxers
AIBA World Boxing Championships medalists